The bismuth-phosphate process was used to extract plutonium from irradiated uranium taken from nuclear reactors. It was developed during World War II by Stanley G. Thompson, a chemist working for the Manhattan Project at the University of California, Berkeley. This process was used to produce plutonium at the Hanford Site. Plutonium was used in the atomic bomb that was used in the atomic bombing of Nagasaki in August 1945. The process was superseded in the 1950s by the REDOX and PUREX processes.

Background
During World War II, the Allied Manhattan Project attempted to develop the first atomic bombs. One method was to make a bomb using plutonium, which was first produced by deuteron bombardment of uranium in the  cyclotron at the Berkeley Radiation Laboratory at the University of California, Berkeley. It was isolated on 14 December 1940 and chemically identified on 23 February 1941, by Glenn T. Seaborg, Edwin McMillan, Joseph W. Kennedy and Arthur Wahl. It was thought that plutonium-239 would be fissile like uranium-235 and suitable for use in an atomic bomb.

Plutonium could be produced through the irradiation of uranium-238 in a nuclear reactor, although no one had yet built one.

Four methods of separation were pursued. Seaborg performed the first successful separation of a weighable quantity of plutonium in August 1942, using a process involving lanthanum fluoride. Isadore Perlman and William J. Knox, Jr., looked into peroxide separation because most elements form soluble peroxides in neutral or acid solution. They soon discovered that plutonium was an exception. After a good deal of experimentation, they found that they could precipitate it by adding hydrogen peroxide to a dilute uranyl nitrate solution. They were then able to get the process to work but it produced tons of precipitate, where the lanthanum fluoride process would produce kilograms.

John E. Willard tried an alternative approach, based on the fact that some silicates absorbed plutonium more readily than other elements; this was found to work but with low efficiency. Theodore T. Magel and Daniel K. Koshland, Jr., researched a solvent-extraction processes and Harrison Brown and Orville F. Hill experimented with separation using volatility reactions, based on how uranium could be readily volatilized by fluorine. They and other chemists at the Manhattan Project's Radiation Laboratory at the University of California,  Metallurgical Laboratory at the University of Chicago and Ames Laboratory at Iowa State College, explored plutonium chemistry. A crucial discovery was that plutonium had two oxidation states, a tetravalent (+4) state and hexavalent (+6) state. with different chemical properties.

The lanthanum fluoride process became the preferred method for use in the Manhattan Project's plutonium separation semiworks at the Clinton Engineer Works and the production facilities at the Hanford Site but further work with the process revealed difficulties. It required large amounts of hydrogen fluoride, which corroded the equipment and Charles M. Cooper from DuPont, who would be responsible for the design and construction of the facilities, began experiencing problems with stabilizing the plutonium in its hexavalent state in the fluoride solution. There were also difficulties with recovering the precipitate through filtration or centrifugation.

While the chemical engineers worked on these problems, Seaborg asked Stanley G. Thompson, a colleague at Berkeley, to have a look at the possibility of a phosphate process. It was known that the phosphates of many heavy metals were insoluble in an acid solutions. Thompson tried phosphates of thorium, uranium, cerium, niobium and zirconium without success. He did not expect bismuth phosphate to work any better but when he tried it on 19 December 1942, he was surprised to find that it carried 98 percent of the plutonium in solution. Bismuth phosphate was similar in its crystalline structure to plutonium phosphate and this became known as the bismuth phosphate process. Cooper and Burris B. Cunningham were able to replicate Thompson's results and the bismuth phosphate process was adopted as a fallback in case lanthanum fluoride could not be made to work. The processes were similar and the equipment used for lanthanum fluoride could be adapted for use with Thompson's bismuth phosphate process. In May 1943, the DuPont engineers decided to adopt the bismuth phosphate process for use in the Clinton semiworks and the Hanford production site.

Process

The bismuth phosphate process involved taking the irradiated uranium fuel slugs and removing their aluminium cladding. Because there were highly radioactive fission products inside, this had to be done remotely behind a thick concrete barrier. This was done in the "Canyons" (B and T buildings) at Hanford. The slugs were dumped into a dissolver, covered with sodium nitrate solution and brought to a boil, followed by slow addition of sodium hydroxide. After removing the waste and washing the slugs, three portions of Nitric acid were used to dissolve the slugs.

The second step was to separate the plutonium from the uranium and the fission products. Bismuth nitrate and phosphoric acid were added, producing bismuth phosphate, which was precipitated carrying the plutonium with it. This was very similar to the lanthanum fluoride process, in which lanthanum fluoride was used as the carrier. The precipitate was removed from the solution with a centrifuge and the liquid discharged as waste. Getting rid of the fission products reduced the gamma radiation by 90 percent. The precipitate was a plutonium-containing cake which was placed in another tank and dissolved in nitric acid. Sodium bismuthate or potassium permanganate was added to oxidize the plutonium. Plutonium would be carried by the bismuth phosphate in the tetravalent state but not in the hexavalent state. The bismuth phosphate would then be precipitated as a by product, leaving the plutonium behind in solution.

This step was then repeated in the third step. The plutonium was reduced again by adding ferrous ammonium sulfate. Bismuth nitrate and phosphoric acid were added and bismuth phosphate precipitated. It was dissolved in nitric acid and the bismuth phosphate was precipitated. This step resulted in reducing the gamma radiation by four more orders of magnitude, so the plutonium-bearing solution now had 100,000-th of the original gamma radiation. The plutonium solution was transferred from the 221 buildings to the 224 buildings, through underground pipes. In the fourth step, phosphoric acid was added and the bismuth phosphate precipitated and removed; potassium permanganate was added to oxidize the plutonium.

In the "crossover" step, the lanthanum fluoride process was used. Lanthanum salts and hydrogen fluoride were added again and lanthanum fluoride was precipitated, while hexavalent plutonium was left in solution. This removed lanthanides like cerium, strontium and lanthanum, that bismuth phosphate could not. The plutonium was again reduced with oxalic acid and the lanthanum fluoride process was repeated. This time potassium hydroxide was added to metathesize the solution. Liquid was removed with a centrifuge and the solid dissolved in nitric acid to form plutonium nitrate.

The final step was carried out at the 231-Z building, where hydrogen peroxide, sulfates and ammonium nitrate were added to the solution and the hexavalent plutonium was precipitated as plutonium peroxide. This was dissolved in nitric acid and put into shipping cans, which were boiled in hot air to produce a plutonium nitrate paste. Each can weighed about 1 kg  and was shipped to the Los Alamos Laboratory. Shipments were made in a truck carrying twenty cans and the first arrived at Los Alamos  on 2 February 1945. The plutonium was used in the Fat Man bomb design tested in the Trinity nuclear test on 16 July 1945, and in the bombing of Nagasaki on 9 August 1945.

Decommissioning
In 1947, experiments began at Hanford on a new REDOX process using methyl isobutyl ketone (codenamed hexone) as the extractant, which was more efficient. Construction of a new REDOX plant commenced in 1949 and operations began in January 1952, the B plant closing that year. Improvements to the T plant resulted in a 30 percent increase in productivity and improvements were made to the B plant. There were plans to reactivate the B plant but the new PUREX plant that opened in January 1956 was so efficient that the T plant was closed in March 1956 and plans to reactivate the B plant were abandoned. By 1960, the PUREX plant's output had surpassed the combined output of the B and T plants and the REDOX plant.

Notes

References
 
 
 
 
 

Nuclear reprocessing
Plutonium
Bismuth
Manhattan Project